Derwin Brown (June 22, 1954December 15, 2000) was an American police captain and the sheriff-elect of DeKalb County, Georgia, who was assassinated on the evening of December 15, 2000, on the orders of defeated rival Sidney Dorsey.

Early life
The firstborn of Burvena and George Robert Brown, Derwin was raised in Long Island, New York, where he attended Woodfield Road School and Malverne Jr. High School for his elementary years of grade school and Malverne High School.

Career
Derwin Brown first served DeKalb as a youth counselor for troubled teens and soon became one of the county's first black patrol officers. He later hosted his own local TV segment called "The Naked Truth" and was the author of his own column in the local Champion News Paper called "Tell It Like It Is." Brown was a 23-year veteran of the DeKalb County Police Department when he was elected to the position of Sheriff on a platform of cleaning up the corruption and graft that had historically troubled the DeKalb County Sheriff's Office.

Assassination
On December 15, 2000, former sheriff's deputy Melvin Walker shot Brown twelve times with a TEC-9 handgun in front of his suburban Atlanta home. As Brown was murdered only three days before he was due to be sworn in as sheriff, DeKalb County Director of Public Safety Thomas Brown assumed control of the post in an interim fashion pending a special election to be held in March 2001.

At trial, prosecutors alleged that Dorsey promised Walker a promotion to deputy sheriff if he killed Brown and that David Ramsey, the backup shooter and getaway driver, was promised a job as a detention officer. Defeated incumbent and former DeKalb County Sheriff Sidney Dorsey was convicted of ordering Brown's assassination. Details that came to light in the trial suggested that Dorsey ordered the killing to obstruct an expected probe into corruption during his tenure as sheriff.

The Brown family filed suit against those involved in the killing. After a civil trial found the defendants liable, the family was awarded a judgment of $776M USD.

The defense attorneys declined to appear on behalf of the defendants at trial; instead, having filed an interlocutory appeal on the issue of liability, they allowed the damages portion of the trial to go forward undefended. The Georgia Court of Appeals ruled in defendant's favor on the issue of whether the state was immune from suit. The plaintiff appealed the ruling up to the Georgia Supreme Court, and that Court upheld the ruling. The United States Supreme Court denied certiorari on a subsequent appeal filed by Brown's family.

After the verdict was rendered virtually uncollectable by the series of failed appeals, a bill was introduced into the Georgia House of Representatives seeking to compensate Brown's family in an amount in excess of $300 million. The bill failed to obtain the necessary votes for passage.

On July 13, 2007, Dorsey confessed to investigators that he had ordered Deputy Patrick Cuffy to carry out the killing. However, he claimed he had called the attempt off prior to Brown's assassination.

Legacy
Derwin and Phyllis Brown had 5 children and 12 grandchildren. Brown's wife, Phyllis Brown, died on Christmas Eve 2006 of heart failure after suffering a debilitating stroke, nine days after leading a candlelight vigil in honor of the anniversary of her husband's murder.

Brown was a member of Omega Psi Phi fraternity. He was also a member of Freemasonry. There is a Masonic Lodge named in his honor, the Derwin Brown Masonic Lodge #599 PHA.

Brown's assassination was featured on Investigation Discovery's series Fatal Encounters, season 1, episode 9, “Who Shot the Sheriff?". The assassination and case were also featured on Oxygen's series Deadly Power, season 1, episode 3, "Above the Law".

The county has named a police precinct near South Dekalb Mall after Derwin Brown, and has also renamed Glasgow Drive to "Derwin Brown Drive" In honor of the slain sheriff-elect.

External links
Ga. Sheriff-Elect Killed in Ambush
After assassination, Brown family seeks peace and truth amid more loss

References

1954 births
2000 deaths
2000 in Georgia (U.S. state)
2000 murders in the United States
People from Malverne, New York
Male murder victims
American police officers
People murdered in Georgia (U.S. state)
Georgia (U.S. state) sheriffs
People from Decatur, Georgia
Murdered African-American people
Deaths by firearm in Georgia (U.S. state)
Assassinated police officers
Assassinated American people
20th-century American politicians
African-American sheriffs
Malverne High School alumni
20th-century African-American politicians
African-American men in politics